Bernardo Harris (born October 15, 1971) is a former American football linebacker in the National Football League. He attended Chapel Hill High School, graduating in 1990. He was recruited by Mack Brown to play at the University of North Carolina and graduated in 1994. After not being drafted, he was signed as a free agent by the Kansas City Chiefs in 1994. At Kansas City, Harris injured his knee in the first week of training camp and was out of football.

Bernardo Harris became a free agent and was signed by the Green Bay Packers in 1995, playing in eleven games his rookie season. Harris played for the Green Bay Packers for seven seasons  and played on the 1996 Super Bowl XXXI and 1997 Super Bowl XXXII teams.

In 2002, Harris was signed as a free agent by the Baltimore Ravens, after a shoulder injury to Ray Lewis. In 2003, Bernardo Harris was placed on the injured reserved and subsequently retired.

Significant contributions to the NFL

While Bernardo Harris was playing for the Green Bay Packers in the January 3, 1999 playoff game against the San Francisco 49ers, Harris caused a controversial fumble which would largely be recognized as the precursor to video replay in the NFL.

Towards the end of the 1999 playoff game, a pass was caught by Hall of Fame wide-receiver Jerry Rice, following the catch, Bernardo Harris stripped Jerry Rice of the ball, and was recovered by the Green Bay Packers. The game appeared to be won by the Green Bay Packers. However, the call on the field was that Rice was down by contact and San Francisco retained possession. Video replay showed that Rice had fumbled the ball, however, at that time replay was not used in the NFL. The 49ers went on to defeat the Green Bay Packers on that drive, by a final score of 30-27. Due to the controversial Harris call, the NFL announced the following season that it would begin instituting video replay.

References

1971 births
Living people
American football middle linebackers
Green Bay Packers players
Baltimore Ravens players
People from Chapel Hill, North Carolina
Players of American football from North Carolina
North Carolina Tar Heels football players
Chapel Hill High School (Chapel Hill, North Carolina) alumni